Loren Dykes  (born 5 February 1988) is a football coach and player who is the assistant coach for Bristol City and a player for Cardiff City and the Wales women's national football team.

Dykes began her playing career as a winger or forward before being converted into a full-back. She won her 100th cap for Wales on 4 April 2019, in a friendly against the Czech Republic, at Rodney Parade in Newport.

Early life
Dykes attended Cwmtawe Community School and also played for Llanelli Reds.

Club career
Dykes started with Cardiff City Ladies and featured in the UEFA Women's Cup with the Bluebirds, before signing for Bristol Academy during 2008–09.

Dykes played in the 2011 FA Women's Cup final as a winger, then in the 2013 final having retrained as a right-back. Bristol lost both finals to Arsenal.

In July 2020, Dykes announced that she would retire from playing club football and transition into her coaching career; however, she would remain available for selection for her national team.

International career
Dykes won 17 caps and scored four goals for Wales at U-19 level. She made her senior debut, aged 19, in a 2–1 defeat by the Netherlands in August 2007. She played her 100th match for Wales in a friendly against Czech Republic on 4 April 2019.

While attending UWIC, Dykes was called up to represent Welsh universities in the Home Nations championship.

Dykes was appointed Member of the Order of the British Empire (MBE) in the 2020 New Year Honours for services to women's football in Wales.

Coaching career
Dykes became an assistant coach for her former club Bristol City in July 2020.

References

External links
 
 Loren Dykes  at FAW
 

1988 births
Living people
Bristol Academy W.F.C. players
Wales women's international footballers
FA Women's National League players
Women's Super League players
Cardiff City Ladies F.C. players
Welsh women's footballers
Women's association football fullbacks
FIFA Century Club
Members of the Order of the British Empire